Orlando Kellogg (June 18, 1809August 24, 1865) was a U.S. Representative from New York during the latter half of the American Civil War and the early days of Reconstruction.

Biography
Kellogg was born in Elizabethtown, New York and Kellogg pursued an academic course. He engaged in the carpentry trade in his early youth. He went on to study law, was admitted to the bar in 1838, and commenced practice in Elizabethtown.
He served as surrogate of Essex County 1840–1844.

Kellogg was elected as a Whig to the Thirtieth Congress (March 4, 1847 – March 3, 1849).
He was not a candidate for renomination in 1848.
He resumed the practice of his profession in Elizabethtown, New York.
He served as a delegate to the 1860 Republican National Convention.

Kellogg was elected as a Republican to the Thirty-eighth and Thirty-ninth Congresses and served from March 4, 1863, until his death in Elizabethtown, New York, August 24, 1865.
He was interred in Riverside Cemetery.

State Senator Rowland C. Kellogg (1843–1911) was his son.

See also
List of United States Congress members who died in office (1790–1899)

References
 Retrieved on 2009-5-13

External links

1809 births
1865 deaths
New York (state) state court judges
People of New York (state) in the American Civil War
New York (state) Whigs
Whig Party members of the United States House of Representatives
Republican Party members of the United States House of Representatives from New York (state)
People from Elizabethtown, New York
19th-century American politicians
19th-century American judges